Wasa is an administrative ward in the Iringa Rural district of the Iringa Region of Tanzania. In 2016 the Tanzania National Bureau of Statistics report there were 11,086 people in the ward, from 10,595 in 2012.

Villages / vitongoji 
The ward has 7 villages and 28 vitongoji.

 Wasa
 Itawi
 Kastamu
 Nyakigongo
 Nyamagola
 Uhepwa
 Utiga
 Ikungwe
 Ikungwe
 Makanyagio
 Mkuta
 Mkuzi
 Tambalang’ombe
 Ufyambe Lwamanga
 Ikonongo
 Lunguya
 Usengelindete
 Igula
 Itimbo
 Kigasa
 Umwaga
 Ihomasa
 Ihomasa
 Lupande
 Mkondowa
 Muungano
 Vikula
 Ulata
 Mwefu
 Ngonamwasi
 Ulata
 Mahanzi
 Kibulilo
 Kitamba
 Mahanzi

References 

Wards of Iringa Region